"In Bloom" is a song by the Welsh pop punk band Neck Deep, released as the fourth single from the group's third studio album The Peace and the Panic. The track peaked at 39 on the UK Rock & Metal Singles Chart following the album's release and later won the 2018 Kerrang! Award for Best Song.

The music video was directed by Lewis Cater and was released concurrently with the single.

Personnel
Personnel per booklet.

 Ben Barlow – lead vocals
 Sam Bowden – lead guitar
 Fil Thorpe-Evans - bass
 Dani Washington – drums
 Matt West – rhythm guitar

References

2017 songs
2017 singles